The 1976 European Judo Championships were the 25th edition of the European Judo Championships, and were held in Kiev, Soviet Union on 9 May 1976. Championships were subdivided into six individual competitions, and a separate team competition.

Medal overview

Medal table

Results overview

63 kg

70 kg

80 kg

93 kg

93+ kg

Open class

Teams

References 
 Results of the 1976 European Judo Championships (JudoInside.com)

European Championships
European Judo Championships
1976 in Soviet sport
International sports competitions hosted by the Soviet Union
International sports competitions hosted by Ukraine
1970s in Kyiv
Sports competitions in Kyiv
Judo competitions in Ukraine